Rahman Seifi Azad ( born 1973) is a producer, screenwriter and director who works in cinema, television and theater.

Biography
In 2004 he received a master's degree in Dramatic Literature from the Fine Arts Campus of the University of Tehran.

Due to his interest in arts and especially in theatre and television production, he established and launched the TV program Do Qadam Mande Be Sobh [translated as "Two Steps Remaining to the morning"] broadcast on Shabake Chahar Sima [an Iranian TV Channel]  during 2007. Then he produced and launched another TV program named "Theater Magazine" also broadcast on Shabake Chahar Sima during 2009. He then created, designed and edited many other programs for TV, including “Chashm-e Shab-e Roshan” [translated as “The Eyes of the Bright Knight”].

Among his achievements is the play Taklif, published by Monadi-e Tarbiat Cultural Institute, winning the second national playwriting competition of Ayeneh Tarbiat in 1998.

Filmography

Cinema

Television Series

References

External links

Rahman Seifi Azad – Iranian Movie Database

1972 births
Living people
Iranian directors
Iranian producers
University of Tehran alumni